The Prelude Op. 28, No. 20, in C minor by Frédéric Chopin has been dubbed the "Funeral March" by Hans von Bülow but is commonly known as the "Chord Prelude" due to its slow progression of quarter note chords.

The prelude was originally written in two sections of four measures, ending at m. 9.  Chopin later added a repeat of the last four measures at a softer level, with an expressive swell before the final cadence.

Bar 3 ambiguity 
In many printed scores (for example "Chopin Masterpieces for Solo Piano", Dover Publications Ltd 1998), the last E of bar 3 in the right hand has no flat accidental to cancel the natural accidental of the previous E in the same bar. Therefore, this second E should also be played as E. However, in most performances you will hear an E, in contradiction to the printed score. Arthur Rubinstein's mono recording of the entire set of Op. 28 on RCA, and "Could It Be Magic" by Barry Manilow are some of the few recordings where the E is played as natural.

It is rumoured that Polish scores show the flat accidental and that all others versions are incorrect due to a type-setting error.

On page 64 of Chopin, An Introduction to His Piano Works (2005), Willard A. Palmer notes that "[a]ccording to the editors of the Oxford edition, Chopin is supposed to have added a flat sign before the E in a copy belonging to one of his pupils. It does not appear in the Autograph or the original editions."

Musicologist Jean-Jacques Eigeldinger posits that Chopin intended to include the flat accidental, citing both manuscripts with the accidental (Jane Stirling's, George Sand's, Cheremetieff's) and Auguste Franchomme's transcriptions of the prelude for other instruments, all of which include the flat or its transposed equivalent.

Cultural legacy 

There are a number of references to this prelude in contemporary culture, and these are just a few examples.
 Ferruccio Busoni composed a set of variations, Variationen und Fuge in freier Form über Fr. Chopin's C-moll Präludium, on Prelude No. 20.
 Sergei Rachmaninoff used Prelude No. 20 as his inspiration for Variations on a Theme of Chopin, a set of 22 variations in a wide range of keys, tempos and lengths
 Vince Guaraldi quotes Prelude No. 20 in his rendition of the jazz standard Autumn Leaves.
 George Shearing included a modern arrangement of the piece in his 1963 Old Gold and Ivory.
 The Bill Evans Trio, with Symphony Orchestra, played this prelude in 1965, with an arrangement penned by Claus Ogerman. For this album, the prelude was titled "Blue Interlude".
 Jean-Luc Ponty, Jazz fusion artist, included a version with violin improvisation on his album Storytelling
 "Could It Be Magic" by Barry Manilow is based on Prelude No. 20 and reached  No. 6 on the US charts in 1975. The song was later covered by Donna Summer and Take That. The song was also covered by French singer Alain Chamfort in 1975 under the title «Le Temps qui court».
 The intro and outro to The Moody Blues' early single "Love and Beauty", composed and sung by original member Mike Pinder, features this piano passage.
 The 1988 film Madame Sousatzka features Shirley MacLaine teaching Prelude No. 20 to a gifted piano student.
 Metal band, Angra, recorded a variation of Prelude No. 20 for their 2001 Rebirth album entitled "Visions Prelude".
 The music for the Commodore 64 version of the videogame Ghosts 'n Goblins by Mark Cooksey is based on Prelude No. 20.
 The funeral doom metal band Pantheist used part of Prelude No. 20 in "Envy Us," from their album O Solitude.
 Ken Skinner recorded a version of Prelude No. 20 as a jazz trio piece for the CD Maroon in 1996 under the title "Farewell Europa".
 Jazz trumpeter Chris Botti's 2012 CD Impressions includes a version of Prelude No. 20 as the album's first track.
 The Piano Guys includes variations of parts of Prelude No. 20 in "Kung Fu Piano: Cello Ascends", where not only the variations are used in the finale, but they are also used in many parts of the piece as a harmonic element.
 Marcin Grochowina published trio-variation  and improvisation with this prelude in 2015 on the CD "Chopin Visions". For this album, the prelude was titled "Prelude in c"

See also
 Preludes (Chopin)

References

External links
 Prelude No. 20 on YouTube, performed by Arthur Rubinstein

Compositions by Frédéric Chopin
1839 compositions
Compositions for solo piano
Chopin
Compositions in C minor